Nyamo may refer to:

Nyamo Township, Tibet
Nyamo Namo from Love Hina
Minamo Kurosawa from Azumanga Daioh
Nyamo from Lucky Star